The West Cheshire Railway (WCR) was an early railway company based in Cheshire, England.

Early company history

The WCR was incorporated on 11 July 1861. In 1861, the WCR requested powers to construct a line from Northwich to Chester, with a branch to Helsby, but parliamentary approval was received only for a line via Mouldsworth to Helsby. In 1862, the WCR again sought powers for their line to Chester, with connecting branches from Mouldsworth to Helsby and from Cuddington to Winsford.  Again, parliamentary approval was restricted, being confined to the line to Helsby and a branch to Winsford.

Construction and early WCR operations

Following receipt of its statutory powers, the WCR commenced construction of its main  line running west from the existing Cheshire Midland Railway at Northwich to join the Birkenhead Railway at Helsby Junction. On 15 August 1867,  the WCR became a constituent of the Cheshire Lines Committee (CLC). Construction continued and the line from Northwich to Helsby opened for goods traffic on 1 September 1869 and for passenger trains on 22 June 1870.  The public passenger service from Northwich to Helsby lasted only until 1 May 1875, but workmen's trains continued until 1944. From 1 May 1875, passenger trains from Northwich were re-routed south from Mouldsworth to operate along the newly opened line to Chester Northgate (see below).

A  branch line was built from Cuddington Junction to Winsford & Over railway station, which opened to goods traffic on 1 June 1870 and to passenger trains on 1 July 1870. A further short but important  branch line to Winnington, for goods traffic only, opened on 1 September 1869.

Route and stations

The first station out of Northwich was Hartford and Greenbank, renamed Greenbank on 7 May 1973. Further stations were located at Cuddington, Delamere, Mouldsworth, and Manley before the line's terminus at Helsby and Alvanley station. A goods station, engine shed and locomotive turntable were constructed between Helsby station and the junction with the Birkenhead Railway. Although the passenger service from Northwich to Helsby was terminated in 1875, the line from Mouldsworth to Helsby Junction continued in use until 14 September 1991  for freight trains heading for the Birkenhead Railway.

Chester & West Cheshire Junction Railway

This company was incorporated on 5 July 1865 with the intention of seeking parliamentary approval for a railway linking the WCR's line at Mouldsworth Junction to a new station at Chester Northgate.  It received authorisation and the company and its powers were transferred to the CLC on 10 August 1866.
Construction of the  line began in 1871 and it opened for freight trains on 2 November 1874. Chester Northgate was completed on 1 May 1875, when passenger trains from Manchester and Northwich commenced running to the new station.

See also

 Winsford and Over Branch Line

References

 Notes

Bibliography

 
 
 
 
 

Early British railway companies
Rail transport in Cheshire
Railway companies established in 1861
Railway lines opened in 1865
Cheshire Lines Committee Lines
1861 establishments in England